Andreas "Andi" Schwaller (born 8 July 1970 in Recherswil) is a Swiss curler.

Schwaller started playing curling in 1982. He plays in fourth position as a skip and is right-handed.

In 2001 he won a silver medal at the World Curling Championships, in his home country.  He scored an upset victory over Randy Ferbey in the semifinals, before falling to Peja Lindholm in the final.

At the 2002 Winter Olympics he looked set to make the gold medal game, leading eventual gold medalist Pål Trulsen 6-3 after 8 ends in the semifinal.   Trulsen though made a large comeback, stealing in the 10th end, and then coming up with the winning stolen point in the 11th when Schwaller wrecked on a guard.   He recovered to win the bronze medal game over Sweden, skipped by Lindholm, gaining revenge from the previous years World Championship final result, and earning an Olympic medal.

Teammates 
2002 Salt Lake City Olympic Games

Christof Schwaller, Third

Markus Eggler, Second

Damian Grichting, Lead

Marco Ramstein, Alternate

References

External links
 

1970 births
Living people
Swiss male curlers
Curlers at the 2002 Winter Olympics
Olympic medalists in curling
Medalists at the 2002 Winter Olympics
Olympic bronze medalists for Switzerland
European curling champions
Continental Cup of Curling participants
Swiss curling champions